Charles Charlemont (born Louis Charles Pilet; 21 November 1862, in Paris – 31 May 1942, in Saint-Germain-en-Laye) was a French boxing master and trainer. He is the son of Joseph Charlemont, became one of the greatest savateur.

Charles Charlemont  defeated the Joe Driscoll in  the Fight of the Century in 1899. Following this match, savate was exported to the United States and the United Kingdom where it was taught to the armed forces as Automatic Defense. One of Charlemont's senior students was Comte Pierre Baruzy

References 

1862 births
1942 deaths
People from Paris
French male boxers
French savateurs